The Arkansas County Courthouse for the Northern District is located at East 3rd and College Streets in Stuttgart, Arkansas, the seat of the northern district of Arkansas County.  It is a two-story Classical Revival brick structure resting on a raised basement.  It was designed by J. B. Barrett of the Stuttgart firm Barrett & Ogletree, and built in 1928, in response to the designation of rapidly growing Stuttgart as the seat of the northern district of the county.  The building is an excellent local example of Classical Revival styling, with main entrances on its northern and eastern facades topped by broad pediments and entablatures, with a stepped brick parapet above.

The building was listed on the National Register of Historic Places in 1992.

See also
National Register of Historic Places listings in Arkansas County, Arkansas

References

Courthouses on the National Register of Historic Places in Arkansas
Neoclassical architecture in Arkansas
Government buildings completed in 1928
National Register of Historic Places in Arkansas County, Arkansas
Individually listed contributing properties to historic districts on the National Register in Arkansas
County courthouses in Arkansas
1928 establishments in Arkansas
Stuttgart, Arkansas